Donald Carswell (11 February 1882 – 2 January 1940) was a Scottish barrister, journalist and author. He married Catherine Roxburgh Macfarlane in 1915; their only child, a son, was J. P. Carswell (1918–1977).

References 
 
 
 

1882 births
1940 deaths
Scottish lawyers
20th-century Scottish writers
Scottish journalists
Lawyers from Glasgow
Writers from Glasgow
Alumni of the University of Glasgow